Mil'Von Keishawn James (born September 17, 1985 in Los Angeles, California) is a high school coach of American football. He played college football for the UNLV Rebels, where he led the nation in passes defended, and was not drafted by a professional team in any league. He played college football for the UCLA Bruins from 2003-2005. His younger brother Malik "Fig" James plays for the Nevada Wolfpack.

Early years
James graduated in 2003 from Fremont High School in Los Angeles, California

College career
James played college football for the UCLA Bruins from 2003-2005.  He transferred to the UNLV Rebels in 2005 along with Eric Wright and Rocky Hinds from the USC Trojans and Tony Cade from the Oklahoma Sooners.  As a senior cornerback Mil’Von James was voted to the Second-team-All Mountain West Conference after leading the nation with 19 pass deflections. He would finish his senior season at UNLV with 45 tackles, three force fumbles and one interception. Despite a struggling defense James would be part of the reason that would help land UNLV with the 23rd best pass defense in the nation.

Pre-draft

Coaching career
In 2016 as head coach for the Augustus F. Hawkins High School, James was fired for using ineligible players. 

In 2021 as coach for Inglewood High School, he received criticism of unsportsmanlike conduct for allowing his team to run up a game to the score of 106-0.  The most controversial move came when Coach James went for a two-point conversion when the team was already up 104-0. "How can the Coaching staff of Inglewood High School California feel good about themselves?" quoted the legendary sports announcer Dick Vitale on Twitter.

In 2022 James guided Inglewood to a 13-1 record and the CIF-SS Division 2 final as he continued a remarkable transformation of the program. Mil’von James arrived at Inglewood High School in 2019 and took over a football team that had just gone 0-10.

In his first season, the Sentinels went 12-1 and lost in the CIF-Southern Section Division 13 semifinals by one point.

The Sentinels went undefeated in the shortened 2020 spring season and since then they’ve been on a roll, going 24-2 in the last two seasons. They advanced to the CIF-SS Division 2 semifinals in 2021 and this season they went 13-1 and reached the finals. Leading the way has been James, who is the 2022 Daily Breeze football coach of the year.
Inglewood is 36-3 in three full seasons under James and 40-3 overall.

“I know where we started in year one and how far we’ve gone to get to where we are now,” James said. “It’s a testament to the hard work of my staff. I think we’re ahead of our five-year plan and the best days are ahead of us.

References

External links

BC Lions bio

1985 births
Living people
Players of American football from Los Angeles
American players of Canadian football
Canadian football defensive backs
American football defensive backs
UCLA Bruins football players
UNLV Rebels football players
Cleveland Browns players
BC Lions players
Players of Canadian football from Los Angeles